is the third single of the Morning Musume subgroup Minimoni. It was released on December 5, 2001 and sold 325,440 copies, reaching number three on the Oricon Charts.

The group released this under the alias  for a motion picture version of the popular anime Hamtaro. In the film they appear as hamster caricatures of themselves.

Track listing 
All songs written and composed by Tsunku.

Members at the time

External links 
 Minihams no Ai no Uta entry on the Hello! Project official website

Zetima Records singles
Minimoni songs
2001 singles
Songs written by Tsunku
Song recordings produced by Tsunku
Japanese-language songs
2001 songs
Japanese film songs
Songs written for animated films